Genaro León (born 10 August 1960) is a Mexican former professional boxer who competed from 1984 to 2001. He held the WBO welterweight title in 1989. As an amateur, he competed at the 1984 Summer Olympics.

Amateur career
León represented Mexico at the 1984 Los Angeles Olympic Games, as a welterweight. His results were:
Defeated Daniel Omar Dominguez (Argentina) 5-0
Defeated Akinobu Hiranaka (Japan) 5-0
Defeated Khemais Refai (Tunisia) 3-2
Lost to Mark Breland (United States) KO by 1

Professional career
León turned pro in 1984 and in 1989 captured the inaugural and vacant WBO welterweight title with a KO win over Danny Garcia. He vacated the title without defending it. In 1993 he challenged WBC welterweight title holder James McGirt, but lost a decision.

See also
List of welterweight boxing champions
List of WBO world champions
List of Mexican boxing world champions

References

External links
 

|-

1960 births
Living people
Sportspeople from Culiacán
Boxers from Sinaloa
World Boxing Organization champions
Boxers at the 1983 Pan American Games
Pan American Games bronze medalists for Mexico
Mexican male boxers
Boxers at the 1984 Summer Olympics
Olympic boxers of Mexico
Welterweight boxers
Pan American Games medalists in boxing
Medalists at the 1983 Pan American Games